Redudasyidae is a family of worms belonging to the order Macrodasyida.

Genera:
 Anandrodasys Todaro, Dal Zotto, Jondelius, Hochberg, Hummon, Kanneby & Rocha, 2012
 Redudasys Kisielewski, 1987

References

Gastrotricha